Idrissa Sylla (born 3 December 1990) is a Guinean professional footballer who plays as a forward for the Guinea national team. He is also referred to as Waddle due to him possessing a similar style of play to Chris Waddle.

Club career

Le Mans
Sylla was the joint top scorer for Le Mans during the 2011–2012 Ligue 2 season, along with Idir Ouali, scoring 9 league goals.

Zulte Waregem
In August 2013, Sylla joined Belgian team Zulte Waregem on a two-year contract, following Le Mans' fall to the French lower divisions. He was transferred for an estimated fee of €150,000.

Anderlecht
On 2 February 2015, Sylla joined Anderlecht on a four-and-a-half-year contract.

Queens Park Rangers
On 30 August 2016, English club Queens Park Rangers announced the signing of Sylla from Anderlecht on a three-year contract for an undisclosed fee. Sylla made his QPR debut on 10 September 2016, coming off the bench in a 1–1 draw with Blackburn Rovers. He scored his first goal for the club in a 2–1 loss against Huddersfield Town on 17 September 2016. He then scored the winner against Fulham in a 2–1 victory.

Despite spending most of his first season at the club in and out of the starting 11, Sylla finished his first season at Loftus Road as the club's top scorer with 10 goals, many of which came from the bench.

Return to Zulte Waregem
On 5 January 2019, Sylla returned to Zulte Waregem for an undisclosed fee on a -year contract. On 7 August 2019, he joined Oostende on loan.

North East United
On 20 October 2020, Sylla joined Indian Super League club NorthEast United FC on a one-year deal.

Farense
On 11 September 2021, he signed a one-year deal with Farense in Portugal.

International career
Sylla made his debut for Guinea in a friendly against Ivory Coast on 29 February 2012.

He was a member of the Guinea squad at the 2015 Africa Cup of Nations.

Career statistics

Club

International

Scores and results list Guinea's goal tally first, score column indicates score after each Sylla goal.

References

External links
 

1990 births
Living people
Sportspeople from Conakry
Association football forwards
Guinean footballers
Guinea international footballers
2015 Africa Cup of Nations players
2019 Africa Cup of Nations players
Le Mans FC players
SC Bastia players
S.V. Zulte Waregem players
R.S.C. Anderlecht players
Queens Park Rangers F.C. players
K.V. Oostende players
NorthEast United FC players
S.C. Farense players
Ligue 2 players
Championnat National players
Championnat National 2 players
Belgian Pro League players
English Football League players
Indian Super League players
Liga Portugal 2 players
Guinean expatriate footballers
Expatriate footballers in France
Expatriate footballers in Belgium
Expatriate footballers in England
Expatriate footballers in India
Expatriate footballers in Portugal
Guinean expatriate sportspeople in France
Guinean expatriate sportspeople in Belgium
Guinean expatriate sportspeople in England
Guinean expatriate sportspeople in India
Guinean expatriate sportspeople in Portugal